The Mackie Building is a grand commercial building designed by E. Townsend Mix and built in 1879 in Milwaukee, Wisconsin, which housed Milwaukee's Grain Exchange Room, and the original trading pit. In 1973 the building was added to the National Register of Historic Places.

History
The building was originally called the Chamber of Commerce Building or the Grain Exchange. It was built in 1879 as an investment property by U.S. Representative Alexander Mitchell.  During the 1970s, the building underwent extensive restorations.

The exterior remains much as Mix designed it: five and a half stories, plus a tower centered above the main entrance, reaching 160 feet above the street. The first story is clad in gray Minnesota granite. Above that the exterior is gray sandstone and limestone. The windows are different at each story, but unified by alternating bands of color and texture. The roof is a complex of mansards. The north entrance is framed by granite columns and images of the Great Seal of Wisconsin and the bull and bear.

The Grain Exchange was located in a large three-story room in the building.  The room was designed in a Simple Italian architectural style, with soaring ceilings, hand painted frescoes, gold leaf and over 10,000 sq. feet of space.  The grain exchange is closely linked with the early commercial history of Milwaukee, when for a brief time, the city was the world's largest primary wheat market for trading, exporting and inspecting grain.  Milwaukee's lake port was near vast acres of wheat in the state, so the Milwaukee grain exchange conveniently located there and invented and utilized the very first octagonal trading pit.  The grain exchange operated from 1880 to 1935.

The Mackie Building is adjacent to the Mitchell Building, which was also built by Alexander Mitchell, also designed by E. Townsend Mix and is listed on the National Register of Historic Places.

Gallery

References

External links

Buildings and structures in Milwaukee
Commercial buildings completed in 1879
Commercial buildings on the National Register of Historic Places in Wisconsin
Victorian architecture in Wisconsin
Second Empire architecture in Wisconsin
National Register of Historic Places in Milwaukee